King Electric is an electro-pop duo from Austria, founded in 2005 by Peter Hartwig and Chris Isepp.

Career
Hartwig and Isepp met while working in the Viennese music scene, Hartwig as a former member of The Basket Boys and BASK, and Isepp as an electro DJ/Producer and music magazine editor.

In mid-2000, after several studio sessions together, the pair founded the group Sultans of Swing. The first single, "Summerbreeze", was revieweds in the music press in the UK, Germany, and Japan, described by one reviewer as the "charming 1970s MFSB Phillysound". The single reached #1 in the Belgium Radio Charts and was followed by further releases on the band's own label, Top10 Records.

In 2009, they released "Da King", their first single under the name King Electric. A video clip for the track featuring two clowns was presented as part of the Diagonale Festival of Austrian Film in 2010.

By the end of 2012, the duo had released their debut album King Electric and two further singles: "Commit Yourself" and "Out of Reach". In December 2013, they released the first part of the album Remixes Remixology Vol. 1. 

Isepp announced that the new King Electric album, Pluto, would be released in Spring 2021, as well as two singles: "Satellite of Hate", a Depeche Mode cover, and "Oh So Quiet", based on Greta Thunberg's address to the United Nations assembly.

Discography

Albums 
 2012: King Electric
 2013: Remixology Vol 1
 2021: Pluto

Singles 
 2003: Summerbreeze (as Sultans of Swing)
 2004: (Make) A Little Love (as Sultans of Swing)
 2005: The Way You Feel Inside (as Sultans of Swing)
 2009: Da King
 2011: Commit Yourself
 2012: Out Of Reach
 2021: Satellite Of Hate

References

External links
Official website
King Electric at Discogs

Austrian electronic music groups
Austrian pop music groups
Musical groups from Vienna
Musical groups established in 2003
2003 establishments in Austria